Rotten Mountain is a townland in the parish of Drumkeeran in County Fermanagh, Northern Ireland.

External links
 http://www.ballynagarrick.net/ulsterancestors/Drumkeeran.htm
 http://applications.proni.gov.uk/geogindx/parishes/par116.htm

Townlands of County Fermanagh